This is a list of wind farms in South Africa. As of 2023, South Africa has 37 operating wind farms with a total installed capacity of about 3,560 MW.

The first large scale wind farm in South Africa became operational in 2014, and others are in planning and construction stages. Most of these are earmarked for locations along the Eastern Cape coastline. Eskom has constructed one small scale prototype windfarm at Klipheuwel in the Western Cape and another demonstrator site is near Darling with phase 1 completed.

The Department of Energy (DOE) has implemented the Renewable Energy Independent Power Producer Procurement Programme (REIPPPP). This is a tender process consisting of "Rounds" where the cheapest tariff and most competitive Economic Development score is awarded a 20-year Power Purchase Agreement (PPA) with Eskom (the state-owned utility) as the Off-taker. The National Treasury has fully underwritten the PPAs.

Round 1 and Round 2 are mostly completed, Round 3 currently under construction And Round 4 awarded. In Round 1 and 2 there where 15 wind projects were awarded with 20 year PPAs and successfully reached financial close. Progress is ongoing on numerous projects.

See also

Wind farm
List of power stations in SA

References

 
Wind farms
South Africa